The Hazelton Mountains are a grouping of mountain ranges on the inland lee of the Kitimat Ranges of the Coast Mountains in northwestern British Columbia, Canada, spanning the area of Hazelton south to the Nechako Reservoir.  Defined by the British Columbia geographic names office, they span from the Nass River to the Nechako Plateau, and between the Coast Mountains and the Bulkley River, they are considered by geographers to be part of the Interior Mountains complex, though in local perspective they are  considered to be part of the Coast Mountains.  They are neighboured on the west by the Kitimat Ranges and on the east by the southernmost section of the Skeena Mountains; beyond the Nass River, which is their northern boundary, are the Boundary Ranges of the Coast Mountains.  To their southeast is the Nechako Plateau, including the Quanchus Range on the near-island between Ootsa and Eutsuk Lakes of the Nechako Reservoir (the Quanchus may be considered to be part of the Hazelton Mountains in some classification systems).

The Hazelton Mountains consist of several subranges:

North of the Skeena River:
Nass Ranges, between the Kitsumkalum (W) and Kitwanga Rivers (E).
The Nass Ranges include the Tseax Cone, an active volcano which killed 2,000 Nisga'a people.
Kispiox Range, east of the Kitwanga River to the Skeena River.
The town of Hazelton, British Columbia is at the range's southeast corner.
South of the Skeena River and west of the Bulkley River:
Bulkley Ranges, the highest summit is Seven Sisters Peaks, southwest of Kitwanga, and which is also the highest summit of the Hazelton Mountains.  They include the:
Bornite Range
Howson Range, the highest summit of which is Howson Peak, 
O.K. Range
Rocher Déboulé Range
Telkwa Range
 Tahtsa Ranges, including the:
Chikamin Range
Kasalka Range
Morice Range
Sibola Range
Tochquonyalla Range
Whitesail Range
Pattullo Range

References

 
Skeena Country
Nechako Country
Bulkley Valley
Mountain ranges of British Columbia